José Araneta Cabantan (born June 19, 1957) is a Filipino prelate of the Catholic Church, serving as the Archbishop of the Metropolitan Archdiocese of Cagayan de Oro in the Philippines.

Early life

José Araneta Cabantan was born in Lagonglong, Misamis Oriental, on June 19, 1957. He completed his secondary education at Saint John the Baptist High School in Lagonglong. He subsequently received his bachelor's degree in Chemical Engineering from the Cebu Institute of Technology in Cebu City, his master's degree in Pastoral Ministry from St. John Vianney Theological seminary in Cagayan de Oro, and his Licentiate in Sacred Theology from the Loyola School of Theology in Manila.

He was ordained a priest on April 30, 1990, in Lagonglong for the Metropolitan Archdiocese of Cagayan de Oro.

After a year as associate pastor at the cathedral, he was, from 1991 to 1995, Administrator of the San Roque parish of Catarman, Camaguin. From 1995 to 1997 he was Dean of Studies at the San Jose de Mindanao Seminary in Cagayan de Oro. After three years of study at the Loyola School of Theology and one year as Director of the San Jose Seminary in Quezon City, he was, from 2000 to 2007, formator at the St. John Vianney Theological Seminary in Cagayan de Oro. From 2007 to 2010 he was pastor of the Medalla Milagrosa parish in Cagayan de Oro.

Episcopacy

Cabantan was elected Bishop of Malaybalay on February 18, 2010, after the retirement of his predecessor Honesto Pacana, S.J., and was consecrated on April 30 by Edward Joseph Adams, then Apostolic Nuncio to the Philippines.

Within the Episcopal Conference of the Philippines, Bishop Cabantan served as President of the Episcopal Commission for Basic Communities.

On June 23, 2020, Pope Francis appointed Cabantan as the fifth Archbishop of the Metropolitan Archdiocese of Cagayan de Oro after the retirement of his predecessor Archbishop Antonio Ledesma and was canonically installed on August 28, 2020.

References

Further reading 

21st-century Roman Catholic archbishops in the Philippines
1957 births
Living people
Roman Catholic archbishops of Cagayan de Oro
People from Misamis Oriental
Visayan people
Filipino archbishops